The following are the national youth records in Olympic weightlifting in Iran. Records are maintained in each weight class for the snatch lift, clean and jerk lift, and the total for both lifts by the I.R. Iran Weightlifting Federation.

Current records

Boys

Girls

Historical records

Boys

References

Weightlifting in Iran
National records in Olympic weightlifting
Iranian records